Sopu-Korgon is a village in Alay District of Osh Region of Kyrgyzstan. Its population was 3,232 in 2021.

Nearby villages include Terek and Jergetal.

References

External links 
 Satellite map at Maplandia.com

Populated places in Osh Region